Blissfield is an unincorporated community in southwestern Clark Township, Coshocton County, Ohio, United States.  It has a post office with the ZIP code 43805.  It lies along State Route 60 between Warsaw and Killbuck.

History
Blissfield was laid out in 1890 when the railroad was extended to that point. The community derives its name from Bliss, a grandson of one Abram Weatherwax. A post office was established at Blissfield in 1889, and remained in operation until 2002.

References

Unincorporated communities in Ohio
Unincorporated communities in Coshocton County, Ohio